The Qatar Law Forum of Global Leaders in Law is a non-profit institution established under the patronage of the Government of Qatar with the purpose of bringing together prominent members of the global legal community, in addition to senior figures in the fields of economics, and politics. The inaugural Law Forum was held in Doha from 29–31 May 2009.

History
In 2008, the Qatari Ministry of Foreign Affairs announced plans to hold an international conference of what it termed "Global Leaders in Law", defined as prominent jurists, academics, and legal practitioners from legal jurisdictions representing every continent, and region in the world. The stated purpose of the conference was for delegates to discuss pressing matters of international legal, economic, and political concern, with a particular focus on addressing such issues in the context of the Arab and Muslim worlds.

These initial plans were later expanded upon to encompass a wider mandate of fostering inter-jurisdictional legal dialogue and supporting a "Global Commitment to the Rule of Law". The spectrum of delegates was widened to include economists, bankers, international policy experts, and members of regional and international non-governmental organisations (NGOs). Lord Woolf, the former Lord Chief Justice of England and Wales, and Sir William Blair, a prominent High Court Judge in England and Wales, and expert on Islamic finance, were appointed as the Law Forum's Co-Conveners.

The organising process for the Law Forum was overseen by Institution Quraysh for Law & Policy (iQ), a Qatar-based transnational law firm and think-tank, and the Qatari Ministry of Foreign Affairs' Permanent Committee for Organizing Conferences.  iQ's Principal and Chief Lawyer, Malik R. Dahlan, was appointed as the Law Forum's Director.

Inaugural Law Forum
The inaugural assembly of the Law Forum took place in the Qatari capital, Doha, from 29–31 May 2009, and was attended by more than 500 delegates from 65 different legal jurisdictions. The event was primarily made up of panel sessions covering a range of legal, economic, and political matters:

 The implications of globalisation on justice
 The role of international judicial bodies
 Shari’ah and legal reform in the Arab World
 The Rule of Law
 Islamic finance
 Sports law
 Local and international legal practice
 Corporate centres and financial markets
 Global governance
 Regulatory law and the Credit Crunch
 Law and women
 The new Qatar international judiciary
 New trends in legal education development
 International dispute resolution, and the place of law and economics

Participants
In addition to the attendance of senior members of the Qatari political and legal establishment, including the Prime Minister and Minister of Foreign Affairs of Qatar, Sheikh Hamad bin Jassim bin Jaber Al-Thani, and the Qatari Attorney General, Dr. Ali bin Fetais Al-Marri, participants in the inaugural Law Forum included serving chief justices from 12 different legal jurisdictions, the President of the U.K. Supreme Court, Lord Phillips of Worth Matravers, the President of the International Court of Justice, Hisashi Owada, the President of the European Court of Human Rights, Jean-Paul Costa, the Chief Prosecutor of the International Criminal Court, Luis Moreno-Ocampo, and senior members of the World Bank, and the International Monetary Fund.

Future plans
Qatar's Assistant Foreign Minister for Follow-Up Affairs, Mohammed Al-Rumaihi, and the Law Forum's Director, Malik R. Dahlan, have stated that the Qatar Law Forum of Global Leaders in Law intends to hold its second full assembly in Doha in late 2011 or early 2012.

References

External links 
 Qatar Law Forum of Global Leaders in Law Homepage

Non-profit organisations based in London
Non-profit organisations based in Qatar
International conferences in Qatar
2009 establishments in Qatar